Hey is a Polish rock band founded in Szczecin in 1991 by guitarist Piotr Banach and lead singer Kasia Nosowska. It is one of the most popular Polish music acts of the 1990s.

Although Hey sometimes described themselves as the first Polish grunge band, their melodic, guitar-driven rock and eclectic appearance owed more to new wave and heavy metal influences; their first three albums contained songs in both Polish and English. During the band's mid-1990s heyday, they sold out stadiums throughout Poland, and attempted to break into the English-language market with a series of concerts overseas and an English version of their 1995 album ?. When this failed to arouse interest, the band began to write in Polish only, and gradually adopted a harder-edged, more industrial-influenced sound. Overall, the band has sold over 2.3 million album copies (last updated in April 2020).

In addition, Nosowska has also enjoyed a successful career as a solo artist. She has released six solo albums that derive more from an electronica style.

Personnel

Current line-up
 Kasia Nosowska (vocals)
 Paweł Krawczyk (guitar)
 Marcin Żabiełowicz (guitar)
 Robert Ligiewicz (drums, percussion)
 Jacek Chrzanowski (bass guitar)
 Marcin Macuk (keyboards)

Former members
 Piotr Banach (guitar) (1992-1999)
 Marcin Macuk (bass guitar) (1992)

Discography

Studio albums

Remix albums

Extended plays

Live albums

Video albums

References

External links
 
 
 Myspace page

Polish rock music groups
Musical groups established in 1992